Bisa Butler (born Mailissa Yamba Butler in 1973) is an American fiber artist who has created a new genre of quilting that has transformed the medium. Although quilting has long been considered a craft, her interdisciplinary methods -- which create quilts that look like paintings -- have catapulted quilting into the field of fine art. She is known for her vibrant, quilted portraits celebrating Black life, portraying both everyday people and notable historical figures. Her works now count among the permanent collections at the Smithsonian National Museum of African American History and Culture, the Art Institute of Chicago, and about a dozen other art museums nationwide. She has also exhibited at the Smithsonian Museum of American History, the Epcot Center, the National Underground Railroad Freedom Center, and many other venues. In 2020, she was commissioned to quilt cover images for Time magazine, including the "Person of the Year" issue and its "100 Women of the Year" issue. With a multi-year wait list for private commissions, one of Butler's quilts sold at auction in 2021 for $75,000 USD.

Early life 
Bisa Butler, born Mailissa Yamba Butler, was born in Orange, New Jersey, grew up in South Orange, and graduated from Columbia High School in 1991. Her mother is a French teacher from New Orleans and her father, a college president, was born in Ghana. The youngest child in her family, Butler had three siblings. Her interest in art can be traced back to preschool; she won an art competition when she was four years old.

Butler majored in fine art and graduated cum laude from Howard University, where she studied the work of Romare Bearden, attended lectures by prominent black artists such as Lois Mailou Jones, and studied under lecturers such as Elizabeth Catlett, Jeff Donaldson, and Ernie Barnes. Her undergraduate degree was in painting, but she has stated that she never really connected with the medium. She did start working with fabric, making collages on canvas.

Butler went on to complete a master's degree in art education from Montclair State University in 2004. There, she took a Fiber Art class that inspired her choice of quilting as an artistic medium. She said in an interview, "As a child, I was always watching my mother and grandmother sew, and they taught me. After that class, I made a quilt for my grandmother on her deathbed, and I have been quilting ever since." When she replicated her grandmother's wedding photo in quilt form, a piece entitled "Francis and Violette" for a final project, both she and her professor recognized that she had created an entirely new form of quilting.

Along with being a practicing artist, Butler taught art in the Newark Public Schools for over a decade. She now lives and works in West Orange, New Jersey.

Artistry 

Through her quilts, Butler aims to “tell stories that may have been forgotten over time.” Butler often uses kente cloth and African wax printed fabrics in her quilts, so her subjects are "adorned with and made up of the cloth of our ancestor."

Butler's quilts both heavily incorporate African textiles a well as expand on a rich African American quilting tradition. She explains in her artist statement: "African Americans have been quilting since we were brought to this country and needed to keep warm. Enslaved people were not given large pieces of fabric and had to make do with the scraps of cloth that were left after clothing wore out. From these scraps the African American quilt aesthetic came into being....My own pieces are reminiscent of this tradition, but I use African fabrics from my father’s homeland of Ghana, batiks from Nigeria, and prints from South Africa." She has also been inspired by the figurative textile works of Faith Ringgold.

Butler typically works in bright jewel tones rather than representational colors to depict skin tone. Color serves to convey the emotions of the individuals in her quilts rather than their actual complexions. While at Howard, Butler was mentored by members of AfriCOBRA. The artist collective's bright, colorful aesthetic and aim to create positive representations of Black Americans can be found in Butler's body of work, as well.

Her quilts often feature portraits of famous figures in Black history, such as Paul Laurence Dunbar, Jackie Robinson, Frederick Douglass, and Josephine Baker. Butler uses a variety of patterned fabrics, which she carefully selects to reflect the subject's life, sometimes using clothing worn by the subject. Her portrait of Nina Simone, for example, is made of cotton, silk, velvet, and netting, whereas her portrait of Jean-Michel Basquiat is made of leather, cotton, and vintage denim.

Along with her portraits of notable figures, Butler also creates pieces featuring everyday, unknown African American subjects that she bases on found photographs. She describes her fascination for her nameless subjects' unknown stories: "I feel these people; I know these stories because I have grown up with them my whole life." She strives "to bring as many of these unnamed peoples photos to the forefront" so "people will see these ordinary folks as deserving of a spotlight too."

Her pieces are done in life scale in order "to invite the viewer to engage in dialogue--most figures look the viewers directly in their eyes."

Her work, Harlem Hellfighters, was acquired by the Smithsonian American Art Museum as part of the Renwick Gallery's 50th Anniversary Campaign.

In 2021, the Pérez Art Museum Miami acquired her work Black is King as part of the institution's new acquisitions initiative.

Popular appearances 
By 2019, Butler already had a waiting list for commissioned pieces that she estimated to be several years long. This was before her first solo museum exhibit and media attention catapulted her to celebrity among the general public. Three of Butler's quilts sold at auction in 2021, for between $37,500 USD and $75,000 USD. The $75,000 sale price for Nandi and Natalie (Friends) (2007) was almost eight times the anticipated value. At least one personal collector has loaned pieces by Butler to museums for limited-time exhibits.

She has also worked on commission to create a number of magazine covers, including the Fall 2020 cover of Juxtapoz, the March 2020 cover of Time Magazine honoring Wangari Maathai, the  2020 Time magazine "Person of the Year" image of Porche Bennett-Bey and the May/June 2021 edition of Essence magazine. Tarana Burke's memoir sports a cover image quilted by Butler. Additionally, Oprah Winfrey Network (OWN)’s featured Butler's work in its “Juneteenth Artist Showcase.”

Exhibitions 

She has exhibited widely. In 2018 she exhibited at EXPO Chicago and was praised in Newcity and the Chicago Reader. In February 2019 her work was included along with that of Romare Bearden in The Art of Jazz, a Black History Month exhibition in Morristown, New Jersey. Butler's quilts are featured in art books such as Journey of Hope: Quilts Inspired by President Barack Obama (2010) and Collaborations: Two Decades of African American Art : Hearne Fine Art 1988-2008 (2008), and on websites such as Blavity and Colossal. In 2019, she was a finalist for the Museum of Art and Design's Burke Prize. Butler's first solo museum exhibition Bisa Butler: Portraits was co-organized between the Art Institute of Chicago and the Katonah Museum of Art. It was scheduled to first open at the Katonah Museum of Art from March 15 to June 14, 2020; however, after temporarily closing due to the COVID-19 pandemic, the exhibition was extended to October 4, 2020.

Public collections 

 Museum of Fine Arts, Boston, MA
 Art Institute of Chicago, IL
 Newark Museum of Art, NJ
 Orlando Museum of Art, FL
 Minneapolis Institute of Art, MN
 Kemper Museum of Contemporary Art, Kansas City, MO
 Mount Holyoke Art Museum, Hadley, MA
 Nelson-Atkins Museum of Art, Kansas City, MO
 21c Museum of Art, Louisville, KY
 Toledo Museum of Art, OH
Pérez Art Museum Miami, FL

Solo exhibitions 

 Essex County College, Newark, NJ - 2003
 Essex County College, Newark, NJ - 2004
 Organic Soul, NJ - 2006
 Home of Lonnie Austin show, solo exhibit - 2008
 Astahs Fine Art Gallery, Maplewood, NJ - 2008
 Quilt Me A Story, Bloomfield College, NJ - 2008
 Morristown Courthouse, Morristown, NJ - 2015
 Hearne fine art, Faces in Man Places - 2015
 NEWARK Academy, Livingston, NJ - 2015
 Domareki Gallery, Maplewood, NJ - 2015
 Firehouse Gallery, Valley Arts, Orange, NJ - 2015
 Richard Beavers Art Gallery, Brooklyn, NY - 2016
 The Lawrence Art Center, Lawrence, KS - 2017
 "The Storm, The Whirlwind & The Earthquake" Claire Oliver Gallery, New York, NY - 2020
 Bisa Butler, Katonah Museum of Art, NY - 2020
 Bisa Butler, Art Institute of Chicago, IL - 2020 - 2021

References

External links 
 Official website
Bisa Butler on Instagram
Cover of Fiber Art Now magazine, Spring 2019
 
 
 "Artist Bisa Butler Stitches Together the African American Experience" Smithsonian Magazine, July 2020

Living people
African-American women artists
Columbia High School (New Jersey) alumni
Quilters
People from Orange, New Jersey
People from South Orange, New Jersey
Howard University alumni
Montclair State University alumni
Artists from New Jersey
21st-century American artists
21st-century American women artists
21st-century African-American women
21st-century African-American artists
20th-century African-American people
20th-century African-American women
1973 births